Wilkesville Township is one of the twelve townships of Vinton County, Ohio, United States.  The 2010 census found 895 people in the township, 149 of whom lived in the village of Wilkesville.

Geography
Located in the far southern part of the county, it borders the following townships:
Vinton Township: north
Columbia Township, Meigs County: northeast corner
Salem Township, Meigs County: east
Huntington Township, Gallia County: south
Bloomfield Township, Jackson County: southwest corner
Milton Township, Jackson County: west

The farthest south township in Vinton County, it is the only county township to border Gallia County.

Wilkesville, the smallest village in Vinton County, is located in eastern Wilkesville Township.

Name and history
Wilkesville Township was organized in 1815, when its territory was part of Gallia County.

It is the only Wilkesville Township statewide.

Government
The township is governed by a three-member board of trustees, who are elected in November of odd-numbered years to a four-year term beginning on the following January 1. Two are elected in the year after the presidential election and one is elected in the year before it. There is also an elected township fiscal officer, who serves a four-year term beginning on April 1 of the year after the election, which is held in November of the year before the presidential election. Vacancies in the fiscal officership or on the board of trustees are filled by the remaining trustees.

References

External links
Vinton County Chamber of Commerce 

Townships in Vinton County, Ohio
Townships in Ohio